Helicarionoidea is a superfamily of air-breathing land snails and semi-slugs, terrestrial pulmonate gastropod mollusks in the infraorder Limacoidei.

Families
There are three families within the superfamily Helicarionoidea:
 Helicarionidae
 Ariophantidae
 Urocyclidae

Cladogram
The following cladogram shows the phylogenic relationships of this family to other families within the limacoid clade:

Genera
Genera of helicarionoids unassigned to families include:
 Pseudosaphtia de Winter, 2008
 Saphtia de Winter, 2008
 Vanmolia de Winter, 2008

References

Stylommatophora
Gastropod superfamilies